The 1952 Arizona gubernatorial election took place on November 4, 1952. Incumbent Governor John Howard Pyle, the first Republican elected to the office in two decades, ran for reelection to a second term.

John Howard Pyle defeated Democratic nominee Joe C. Haldiman by a wide margin, becoming only the second Republican to be reelected to a consecutive term as Governor of Arizona in the state's history.

Republican primary

Candidates
 John Howard Pyle, incumbent Governor

Democratic primary

Candidates
 Joe C. Haldiman, State Senator
 Sam J. Head, Yavapai County Attorney

Results

General election

Results

References

1952
1952 United States gubernatorial elections
Gubernatorial
November 1952 events in the United States